Garhwal Lok Sabha constituency is one of the five Lok Sabha (parliamentary) constituencies in Uttarakhand. This constituency came into existence in 1957, following the delimitation of Lok Sabha constituencies. It comprises five districts namely Chamoli, Nainital (part), Pauri Garhwal, Rudraprayag and Tehri Garhwal (part).

Assembly segments

After the formation of Uttarakhand

At present, Garhwal Lok Sabha constituency comprises the following fourteen Vidhan Sabha (legislative assembly) segments:

Before the formation of Uttarakhand

Garhwal Lok Sabha constituency comprised the following five Vidhan Sabha (legislative assembly) constituency segments of Uttar Pradesh:

Members of Parliament

Election results

2019

2014

2009

See also
 List of constituencies of the Lok Sabha
 List of parliamentary constituencies in Uttarakhand

References

External links
Garhwal lok sabha  constituency election 2019 date and schedule

Lok Sabha constituencies in Uttarakhand